The Confederate 200 was a NASCAR race held at Boyd's Speedway in Ringgold, Georgia on August 3, 1962 with Joe Weatherly taking the flag after leading 19 of 200 laps

References

NASCAR races in Georgia (U.S. state)